Moonbeam Magic is a 1924 British silent fantasy film directed by Felix Orman and featuring Roy Travers and Mabel Poulton. It was made at Twickenham Studios using Prizmacolor.

Cast
 Arthur Pusey
 Margot Greville 
 Arthur Heslewood 
 Roy Travers 
 Mabel Poulton 
 Kitty Foster
 Joan Carr

References

Bibliography
 Low, Rachael. History of the British Film, 1918-1929. George Allen & Unwin, 1971.

External links
 

1924 films
1920s fantasy films
1920s color films
British fantasy films
British silent films
Films shot at Twickenham Film Studios
Silent films in color
1920s English-language films
1920s British films